Mastocarpus is a genus of red algae belonging to the family Phyllophoraceae.

The genus has almost cosmopolitan distribution.

Species

Species:

Mastocarpus agardhii
Mastocarpus alaskensis
Mastocarpus californianus
Mastocarpus papillatus
Mastocarpus stellatus

References

Phyllophoraceae
Red algae genera